Luca Pedersoli (born 16 March 1971 in Gavardo) is an Italian rally driver. He scored a World Rally Championship (WRC) point when he finished in tenth place on the 2012 Rally d'Italia Sardegna.

Pedersoli competed in enduro motorcycling, winning four regional championships and one national championship between 1989 and 1995. He began rallying in 1996, making his WRC debut on the Monte Carlo Rally in 1998 in a Fiat Cinquecento. He also competed on his home round - Rallye Sanremo - later that year, this time in a Renault Mégane. In 1999 he entered Monte Carlo in a Toyota Celica GT-Four, finishing 11th overall, while in 2000 he campaigned a Fiat Punto Kit Car on the Tour de Corse and in Sanremo.

In 2004 he finished runner-up in the FIA European Rally Championship to Simon Jean-Joseph, driving a Peugeot 306. He then stayed away from rallying until 2009, finishing third in the Italian Asphalt Rally Championship behind the wheel of a Peugeot 206 WRC, winning the category the following year with a Ford Focus RS WRC and again in 2011 with a Citroën C4 WRC.

In 2012 Pedersoli made a successful return to the WRC on the Rally d'Italia Sardegna, piloting a Citroën DS3 WRC to tenth overall and a maiden world championship point.

Complete World Rally Championship results

References

Living people
1971 births
Italian rally drivers
World Rally Championship drivers